Jaime Sifre Dávila (November 24, 1887 – October 6, 1960) was an attorney and judge in Puerto Rico, ultimately serving as an Associate Justice and briefly as the Chief Justice of the Supreme Court of Puerto Rico.

Sifre was born to Jaime Sifre Tarafa and Belén Dávila Santana in Vega Baja, Puerto Rico in 1887 and obtained his law degree from University of Michigan Law School, graduating in 1908.  He married Consuelo Cordova Davila on December 17, 1910, and had six children.

He was appointed to the position of Associate Justice of the Supreme Court of Puerto Rico in August 1952. In 1957, he was appointed by Governor Luis Muñoz Marín to succeed embattled A. Cecil Snyder as Chief Justice.  He only served as chief justice for two months before his resignation. He died October 6, 1960 in San Juan, Puerto Rico. He is buried at the Santa María Magdalena de Pazzis Cemetery.

References

|-

1887 births
1960 deaths
20th-century American judges
Associate Justices of the Supreme Court of Puerto Rico
Burials at Santa María Magdalena de Pazzis Cemetery
Chief Justices of the Supreme Court of Puerto Rico
People from Vega Baja, Puerto Rico
University of Michigan Law School alumni